Haldis Lenes (born 2 January 1957) is a Norwegian sport rower. She was born in Orkdal. She competed at the 1984 Summer Olympics in Los Angeles, where she placed fifth in the double sculls, together with Solfrid Johansen.

References

External links

1957 births
Living people
People from Orkdal
Norwegian female rowers
Olympic rowers of Norway
Rowers at the 1984 Summer Olympics
Sportspeople from Trøndelag